Ulanqab (Wulanchabu) Jining Airport  is an airport located  in the north of the city of Ulanqab in Inner Mongolia, China. The airport received approval from the State Council of China and the Central Military Commission on 31 July 2013. The airport was opened on 25 April 2016.

Facilities
The airport has a runway that is 3,200 meters long and 45 meters wide, and a 35,700-square-meter terminal building with 7 aerobridges. It is projected to handle 1 million passengers and 9000 tons of cargo annually in the next few years.

Airlines and destinations

See also
List of airports in China
List of the busiest airports in China

References

Airports in Inner Mongolia
Airports established in 2016
2016 establishments in China
Ulanqab